The Inconvenient Indian: A Curious Account of Native People in North America is a book by American-Canadian author Thomas King, first published in 2012 by Doubleday Canada. It presents a history of indigenous peoples in North America. The book has been adapted into a documentary film titled Inconvenient Indian directed by Michelle Latimer, which premiered at the Toronto International Film Festival in 2020. The film won Best Canadian Feature Film at the festival.

Summary 
King's work is an account of the history of indigenous rights and treaties in North America. He notes the portrayal of indigenous peoples in popular media as having contributed greatly to public knowledge of North American Indians. The book ends on an optimistic note: "If the last five hundred years are any indication, what the Native people of North America do with the future should be very curious indeed."

Reception 
The book won the 2014 RBC Taylor Prize and was a finalist for the 2013 Trillium Book Award and the 2014 Burt Award for First Nations, Métis and Inuit Literature.

References 

2012 non-fiction books
Books about indigenous rights
Non-fiction books about Native Americans
Canadian non-fiction books
Doubleday Canada books